Digama serratula is a moth of the  family Erebidae. It is found in Africa,  including Kenya.

References

External links 
 Species info

Endemic moths of Kenya
Aganainae
Moths of Africa
Moths described in 1932